Pogogyne zizyphoroides is a species of flowering plant in the mint family known by the common names Sacramento mesamint and Sacramento beardstyle.

It is native to central and northern California and southwestern Oregon. It grows in vernal pools and similar habitats, including in the Central Valley and California Coast Ranges.

Description
Pogogyne zizyphoroides  is an aromatic annual herb growing erect, its sturdy stem topped with a rounded, headlike inflorescence or interrupted series of two or more clusters.

Some flowers also emerge at the leaf axils. The tubular, lipped flower is under a centimeter long and purple in color, sometimes with white in the throat. Each flower is surrounded by long, hairy green sepals.

References

External links
Jepson Manual Treatment of Pogogyne zizyphoroides
USDA Plants Profile for Pogogyne zizyphoroides
Pogogyne zizyphoroides — UC Photo gallery

zizyphoroides
Flora of California
Flora of Oregon
Natural history of the California chaparral and woodlands
Natural history of the California Coast Ranges
Natural history of the Central Valley (California)
Natural history of the San Francisco Bay Area
Plants described in 1849
Flora without expected TNC conservation status